Fluroxypyr is an herbicide in the class of synthetic auxins.  It is used to control broadleaf weeds and woody brush.  It is formulated as the 1-methylheptyl ester (fluroxypyr-MHE).

External links

References

Herbicides
Chloropyridines
Carboxylic acids
Organofluorides
Auxins